Osip Dymov was the pseudonym for Yosif (Osip) Isidorovich Perelman (1878–1959), a Russian writer. His brother was popular-science writer Yakov Perelman.

Dymov was born in Białystok, in the Grodno Governorate of the Russian Empire (present-day Poland). His father came from Germany, and died when Yosif was quite young. Yosif attended a Russian gymnasium, and went on to study at the Imperial Forestry Institute in St. Petersburg, graduating in 1902.

At the age of 16 he began to publish humorous stories in Russian satiric journals. At that time he took the pen name 'Osip Dymov', from the character in Anton Chekhov's short story "The Grasshopper" (1892), and continued to write under that name throughout his career.

He emigrated to the United States in 1913, at the invitation of Yiddish actor and theatre director Boris Thomashefsky, and subsequently became known for his contributions to Yiddish theatre. Among his most popular plays are  Yoshke Musikant (Yoshke the musician; 1914) and Bronx Express (1919). The latter play had its premiere in 1919 in a Yiddish translation, at the Jewish Art theatre of Jacob Ben-Ami; it was later translated into English and performed at the Astor Theatre on Broadway, in 1922, to mixed reviews.

See also
List of Russian-language writers

References

External links
 Osip Dymov by Caraid O'Brien

1878 births
1959 deaths
People from Białystok
People from Belostoksky Uyezd
Emigrants from the Russian Empire to the United States
American people of Polish-Jewish descent
Russian-language writers
Yiddish theatre